Tammy Janine Morales (born October 23, 1968) is an American politician from Seattle, Washington. She was elected to represent District 2 on the Seattle City Council in November 2019.

Early life and education
Morales was raised in San Antonio, Texas by a single mother who always worked two jobs.

Morales attended the University of Texas at San Antonio, where she earned a Bachelor of Arts in Anthropology. She later earned a Master of Science in Community and Regional Planning from the University of Texas at Austin.

Career
Morales served as Legislative Director for a state legislator in the Texas House of Representatives where she worked with state agencies and advocates to develop legislation on TANF initiatives, childcare funding, and low-income housing. Morales then worked as a budget and policy analyst for the New York City Independent Budget Office where she focused on children’s service agencies.

Morales moved to Seattle in 2000 and worked for nonprofits focused on community-centered development and impactful philanthropy. Morales later started a successful consulting firm providing community development, advocacy and communications services with specialties in cross-sector strategic planning, public policy research and analysis, and community building and convening. Work on food access research and programming included clients such as the City of Seattle Office of Sustainability and Environment and Seattle-King County Public Health.

Morales completed a two-year term as a Human Rights Commissioner for the City of Seattle in July 2019 and also served on the board of the Rainier Beach Action Coalition.

Political career

2015 Seattle City Council Election
In the 2015 general election, Morales came within 344 votes of District 2 Seattle City Council member Bruce Harrell, a two-term incumbent, former mayoral candidate, and Seattle lawyer. Harrell did not run for re-election in 2019.

2019 Seattle City Council Election
In January 2019, Morales declared her candidacy for Seattle City Council District 2 and received an endorsement from U.S. Rep. Pramila Jayapal of Seattle, who co-chairs the Congressional Progressive Caucus.

Morales, along with incumbents Lisa Herbold and Kshama Sawant, received national attention when Amazon donated $1.45 million to support opposing candidates via the Seattle Metropolitan Chamber of Commerce's political action committee, the Civic Alliance for a Sound Economy (CASE). In her campaign, Morales supported a head tax for Seattle corporations, legislation opposed by Amazon and that in 2018 Seattle City Council approved then quickly rescinded. In an email to supporters, Mayor Jenny Durkan called Morales a "socialist" — Morales's political affiliation is Democrat — and endorsed District 2 candidate Mark Solomon.

Morales won the 2019 general election with 60.5% of the vote.

Seattle City Council
Morales assumed the office of District 2 Councilmember in January 2020, representing Rainier Beach, Beacon Hill, Chinatown/International District, SODO and Georgetown.

Electoral history

2015 election

2019 election

Personal life
Morales has been a Seattle resident for nearly 20 years. She is a mom with three kids - two in the Seattle Public School system and one at Portland State. Morales and her family call the Lakewood neighborhood home.

References

External links
 Campaign website

Seattle City Council members
Women city councillors in Washington (state)
21st-century American women politicians
21st-century American politicians
Living people
1968 births
University of Texas at San Antonio alumni